Aulosaphes is a genus of wasps belonging to the family Braconidae.

Species:

Aulosaphes chinensis 
Aulosaphes convergens 
Aulosaphes deserticola 
Aulosaphes fujianensis 
Aulosaphes psychidivorus 
Aulosaphes rasuli 
Aulosaphes semifasciatus 
Aulosaphes unicolor 
Aulosaphes vechti 
Aulosaphes wellsae

References

Braconidae
Braconidae genera